Neolithodes vinogradovi is a species of king crab whose native habitat ranges from the Arabian Sea to the Coral Sea.

Small differences were observed between the specimen found in the Indian Ocean and the two found in the Coral Sea.

Etymology 
"Neolithodes" is derived from Greek and Latin and means "new stone-crab", while the species name "vinogradovi" is a dedication to the carcinologist L. G. Vinogradov.

References 

King crabs
Crustaceans described in 1988
Crustaceans of the Indian Ocean